Quail Ridge is an unincorporated community and census-designated place in Pasco County, Florida, United States. Its population was 1,040 as of the 2010 census.

Geography

References

Unincorporated communities in Pasco County, Florida
Unincorporated communities in Florida
Census-designated places in Pasco County, Florida
Census-designated places in Florida